Evasi0n, (stylized as "evasi0n"), is a untethered jailbreak program for iOS 6.0 - 6.1.2 and for iOS 7.0 - 7.0.6 (with evasi0n7). It is known for a portable code base and minimal use of arbitrary code execution. More than seven million copies of Evasi0n were downloaded and presumably installed in the first four days after release. It was released on 4 February 2013. Four of the six exploits used were patched by Apple on 18 March 2013 with the release of iOS 6.1.3, which meant the end of the original version of evasi0n. On 22 December 2013, the evad3rs released a new version of evasi0n that supports iOS 7.x, known as evasi0n7. One major exploit used by this jailbreak was patched by Apple with the 4th beta of iOS 7.1 and two more with beta 5. The final release of iOS 7.1 fixed all the exploits used by evasi0n7.

The evasi0n jailbreak first remounts the root file system as read-write and then achieves persistence by editing the /etc/launchd.conf file, which launchd consults. Evasi0n then applies patches in the kernel, bypassing address space layout randomization by triggering a data fault and reconstructing the kernel slide by reading the faulting instruction from the appropriate ARM exception vector.

See also
 p0sixspwn, an userland jailbreak for iOS 6.1.3-6.1.6 developed by iH8sn0w, winocm and SquiffyPwn.
 Cydia, an open-source package manager for iOS which uses APT repositories to get apps and tweaks.

References

External links
 – official site

IOS software
IOS jailbreaks